The Gârcin is a left tributary of the river Tărlung in Romania. Its source is in the Piatra Mare Mountains. It flows into the Tărlung near Săcele.

References

Rivers of Romania
Rivers of Brașov County